The Dutch Eredivisie in the 1970–71 season was contested by 18 teams. Feijenoord won the championship.

League standings

Results

See also
 1970–71 Eerste Divisie
 1970–71 Tweede Divisie
 1970–71 KNVB Cup

References

 Eredivisie official website - info on all seasons 
 RSSSF

Eredivisie seasons
Netherlands
1